Edward Connor may refer to:
Edward Connor (cricketer) (1872–1947), English cricketer
Ted Connor (1884–1955), English footballer
Ned Connor (1850–1898), American baseball player

See also

Edward Connors (disambiguation)
Edward O'Connor (disambiguation)